"We Need a Resolution" is a song recorded by American singer Aaliyah, featuring a guest appearance by American musician Timbaland, for her eponymous third and final studio album (2001). It was written by Static Major and Timbaland, while the production was handled by the latter. A "bouncing" alternative R&B, hip hop and electro-funk song, "We Need a Resolution" speaks about a passive-aggressive relationship. It was released as the lead single from Aaliyah on April 13, 2001, by Blackground Records and Virgin Records.

Upon its release, "We Need a Resolution" received acclaim from most music critics. A moderate commercial success, it peaked at number 59 on the US Billboard Hot 100. Internationally, it reached the top 40 in Canada, Belgium (Wallonia), the Netherlands and the United Kingdom. The accompanying music video for the song, directed by Paul Hunter, was conceived as an "exclusive peek" into Aaliyah's life and features her carrying snakes, among other scenes.

Background
During the recording of her third studio album, Aaliyah was also filming her second film Queen of the Damned in Australia. Due to her hectic schedule at the time, she decided to record the album simultaneously with the filming, thus her team of producers–excluding Timbaland–traveled to Australia. Due to unforeseen issues with Blackground Records, Timbaland was not expected to appear on the album at all. According to Tim Barnett, former assistant to songwriter Static Major, they "went back to New York and did them in either Sound King or Manhattan studio. We did them right after the New Year. Part of the problem was Timbaland and Missy weren't even going to be on the album because of problems with Blackground. Aaliyah talked Tim into producing records for the album, so Timbaland did it out of love for Babygirl." Once Aaliyah reached out to Timbaland and asked him to produce songs for the album, there were constant doubts about him meeting his deadline in time due to the last-minute request. According to producer Rapture Stewart, Timbaland came on board during the last week of the album's production.

Music and lyrics
A "bouncing" alternative R&B, Hip hop and electro-funk song, "We Need a Resolution" has been described as having a "seductive Middle Eastern vibe", as the backing track "slithers along with an almost Egyptian feel". Peter Piatkowski from PopMatters says, it is "a mini-suite, cramming sounds of electrofunk, pop, and soul". On the song, Timbaland combines "idiosyncratic beats, moody, off-key melodies and an insistent, dirgelike chorus for a strangely hypnotic effect". The production, has a sparse arrangement with stop-start drum patterns, hand claps, while also implementing "Horror-movie organs". Vocally, Aaliyah displays, "quivering vocals", that "unnervingly evoke the feelings of fear and desperation that often precede a breakup".

Lyrically, "We Need a Resolution" maturely presents two perspectives in a passive-aggressive relationship. "Aaliyah is bitter about her boyfriend's actions, but sly enough to hide her personal disgust so that her complaints have a universal feel". According to  Natelegé Whaley from Mic, the song opens with warpy clarinet samples, as Timbaland avoids confrontation by repeatedly saying "I'm tired of arguing girl." Aaliyah's first line in the song cuts to the chase, responding in a relaxed yet direct manner: "Did you sleep on the wrong side? / I'm catching a bad vibe." Aaliyah's sinuously sung concerns are playfully dismissed in Timbaland's featured rap. The song leaves its hook unresolved, plays backwards after Timbaland's rap, and concludes with a reversed loop of the vocal "where were you last night", which echoes the female protagonist's sentiment.

In an interview with MTV, Aaliyah was asked if the song spoke about a specific person or situation, and she denied, saying: "Not personally, no. This song just speaks about relationships and things that happen in life. This particular song doesn't touch on anything that happened to me in my life, it just speaks about a relationship that has gone a little sour and the lady's asking for a resolution. [She's saying] We need to talk, we need to solve this."

Release and promotion
"We Need a Resolution" was not originally scheduled to be released as the lead single from Aaliyah. Due to the uncertainty with Timbaland being able to meet his deadline, the song "Loose Rap" was chosen as the album's lead single; however, as he managed to meet it, Blackground Records decided that "We Need a Resolution" was going to be the lead single instead. It was released on April 13, 2001, by Blackground and Virgin Records. On April 26, 2001, Aaliyah went on MTV's TRL and BET's 106 & Park to promote and introduce the video for "We Need a Resolution".

In August 2021, it was reported that Aaliyah's recorded work for Blackground (since rebranded as Blackground Records 2.0) would be re-released on physical, digital, and, for the first time ever, streaming services in a deal between the label and Empire Distribution. Aaliyah, including "We Need a Resolution", was re-released on September 10.

Critical reception
Daryl Easlea from BBC stated: "Opener We Need A Resolution – a duet with Timbaland – demonstrates her strength. She was not a teenager anymore and the almost gothic setting over skeletal beats underlines this new maturity". Chuck Taylor from Billboard gave "We Need a Resolution" a mixed review. Although he praised Aaliyah's vocal delivery by saying: "Aaliyah's light but direct delivery complements the hectic track well" and said the song was classic Aaliyah, he expressed his hopes that she would show more growth and variety just as well as she was building her acting resume. In a review of Aaliyah, Michael Paoletta from Billboard described the song as being "wickedly hypnotic". Damien Scott from Complex felt that the song was one of the strongest from Aaliyah and that it showed her being more grown and confident. He also felt that the song was both one of Aaliyah's best vocal performances and Timbaland's best guest rap verses. Chris Heath from Dotmusic praised the song by saying "it's what's going on beneath the chorus and verse that makes We Need A Resolution such an alluring proposition". He also felt that Aaliyah "produced another classy slice of experimental R&B".

Connie Johnson from the Los Angeles Times felt that "We Need a Resolution", along with "Rock the Boat", was a standout song from Aaliyah. In a review of Aaliyah, Luke McManus from the Irish publication RTÉ felt that it "is a highlight – a heartfelt tale of domestic stress over backward loops, deranged arpeggios and a rare Timbaland appearance on the microphone". Teen People included the song in their "Hottest Song of 2001" sweepstakes. Rich Bellis from The Atlantic praised Aaliyah's vocals on the song, describing them as going "from staccato to snake-charmer and a beat that hopscotches all over the place". Alexis Petridis from The Guardian felt that, compared to other records played on mainstream radio, the song sounded "like an unhinged experiment in sound, one that just happened to have an insistent, catchy chorus attached". George Lang from The Oklahoman praised Aaliyah's vocals on the song saying, "On her most recent single, "We Need a Resolution," Aaliyah's vocal delivery on the status of a relationship was as serious and expressive as they come". 

In a retrospective review, Billboard, compared the song to Ja Rule and Jennifer Lopez duets and felt the song "wasn’t the greatest choice of lead a single from Aaliyah", due to its complex subject matter. Overall, the publication thought the song remained "one of the set’s most rewarding numbers" and praised both Aaliyah's vocals and the songs production. In a retrospective  review of Aaliyah's self-tiled album Peter Piatkowski from PopMatters felt that "We Need a Resolution" "harkened to the future of Black pop music in which hip-hop, pop, synth-pop, and soul would be pulled together into a brilliant, shiny sound".

Accolades

Commercial performance
In the United States, "We Need a Resolution" debuted at number 78 on the Billboard Hot 100 on June 2, 2001. It reached its peak at number 59 five weeks later, on June 30. The song made its final appearance on the chart dated August 25, at number 95. On the Hot R&B/Hip-Hop Songs, the song peaked at number 15 on June 30. It also peaked within the top 40 on both Tropical Airplay and Rhythmic charts, at numbers 31 and 38, respectively. In Canada, the song peaked at number 26.

In the United Kingdom, "We Need a Resolution" peaked at number 20 on the UK Singles Chart on July 21. On the UK Dance Chart, it debuted at number 14 on July 14 and peaked at number six the following week. The song also peaked at number six on the UK R&B Chart. According to the Official Charts Company (OCC), "We Need a Resolution" is Aaliyah's eighth best-selling single in the UK. In Belgium, the song peaked at number 28 in Wallonia on September 29. In the Netherlands, the song peaked at number two on the Tipparade chart on August 18, and at number 37 on the Single Top 100 on August 4.

Music video

Background

The accompanying music video for "We Need a Resolution" was directed by Paul Hunter and filmed in April 2001 in Los Angeles. Hunter had previously worked with Aaliyah in 1996 on her music videos for "Got to Give It Up" and "One in a Million". After directing the latter, Hunter wanted to work with Aaliyah again on other projects, but that never came into fruition due to scheduling conflicts. According to Hunter, they "had a pretty good connection to other projects and both went our different ways. I wanted to work with her on a couple of projects after that but she wanted to go in another direction". After years of running into each other, Aaliyah reached out to Hunter while recording Aaliyah and expressed that she wanted to work with him again. Hunter explained: "She'd gone her direction, I'd gone my direction and then over time we started to see each other around and as she was making the record, she called me and said, 'Hey, I want to connect back with you on this project, try to recreate the magic that we did on "One in a Million"."

Theme
Hunter explained the video's theme: "One of the things that she wanted to do, she wanted to obviously dance, and she was really great at it. I felt that the idea behind that connection, we wanted an exclusive peek into her life, so the idea there was to create a sense that every room, every scenario that you're looking at something that only certain people can see". He added: "It's almost like if you've ever seen a celebrity in the airport, they're going into a first class lounge, or they're going into a private hallway, they sort of slip past you". Multiple snakes were used for the video, with Hunter saying: "I think that idea was about danger. I don't know if it was her idea or my idea, but ultimately it was about her being in control of something that was dangerous or that would create some sort of tension in the story and that ultimately she was in control of it…Aaliyah always wanted something that was different from what was going on".

In an interview with People, Aaliyah discussed her experience working with snakes for the video: "I saw bags moving in the corner, and I found out they were real snakes. I was a little nervous, but I kinda like doing crazy stuff." Prior to the video, she had previously worked with snakes during a photo shoot. She stated: "I first dealt with snakes when I was in Australia and I did the photo shoot for the album. We used five pythons in the shoot. At first, I was a little nervous, but once I started to handle them, I totally fell in love and felt an affinity toward them. They're very mysterious creatures. They live in solitude, [and] there are times in my life [when] I just want to be by myself. There are times I can't even figure myself out. I feel they are very complex creatures, [but] at the same time, they're sexy, too. That's why they represent Aaliyah pretty well. They're dangerous, but quite beautiful. I thought that it would be an animal that could represent me on this album, so I wanted to take it from the photo shoot to the video and probably throughout the whole project."

Fashion
In the video, Aaliyah wore various outfits, including a black gown by Italian designer Roberto Cavalli. According to her stylist Derek Lee, Aaliyah wore the gown backwards because "It was covering too much of the front, but it had a lot of skin out in the back, so we flipped it". Lee further said: "Usually I would get an ok from Cavalli to do it, but we didn't have time, so I just kind of did it anyway they liked it, thank God". To uphold the snake theme for the video, Aaliyah was shown wearing Gianfranco Ferré's spring 2001 fringe reptile tube dress in one of the video's scenes. Just like the Cavalli dress, Ferré's dress was worn differently as well. Lee stated: "that wasn't worn right [either]. The bottom looked like a skirt but it was actually supposed to be a dress. So we used it as a skirt and then I custom-made a snakeskin top to go with it." In another scene, Aaliyah is shown wearing a blue outfit that was custom made by designer Linda Stokes, who designed clothes for the group TLC. Lee wanted the outfit to be futuristic: "I came with some fabric and was like, I want this made for like a futuristic kind of a thing. And, boom, she made it for me. And I customized the jeans in the dance scene".

Synopsis
The video opens with Aaliyah sitting in a dark room, wearing a black dress, while also appearing on a television screen performing the first verse. She is also shown sitting on a large question mark as it moves through a blue tunnel. Leading up to the chorus, Aaliyah is seen laying on a glass bed with headphones on. During the second verse and the next chorus, she appears in a snake pit with a snake around her neck, wearing snakeskin underwear. As Timbaland's rap verse begins, he can be seen in a dark room wearing shades. Aaliyah performs a dance routine with other dancers during Timbaland's verse, wearing a dragon T-shirt. The video closes with Aaliyah in the dark bedroom scene again and with one of the male dancers.

Reception
The music video for "We Need a Resolution" made its television debut on BET during the week of April 22, 2001. The following week, the video made its debut on MTV. During the week of May 13, the video was the tenth most-played on MTV. The following week, it was the fifth most-played video on BET.

Jeff Lorenz from Yahoo! Music described the video as "darkly exotic". Sal Cinquemani from Slant Magazine praised the video for its sultry images and felt that "the clip for "Resolution" marked the singer's transition from semi-awkward adolescence to full-fledged, unapologetic womanhood". Kathy Landoll from Noisey Vice mentioned that Aaliyah "adopted this sexy yet spacey motif, and we see it come to life in We Need A Resolution." She also stated: "From see-through lace to gothic make up, and back around to one-dot lipstick application and free-flowing curls, "We Need A Resolution" captured every angle of Aaliyah's existence at the time". Steffanee Wang from Nylon compared Aaliyah's "snake moment" in the video to Britney Spears's snake infused performance at the 2001 MTV Video Music Awards. Ultimately, she deemed both performances as "top moments in reptilian pop culture history".

Track listings and formats

US 12-inch vinyl
 "We Need a Resolution" (album version) – 4:02
 "We Need a Resolution" (instrumental) – 4:02
 "We Need a Resolution" (no rap) – 3:54
 "We Need a Resolution" (a cappella) – 4:03

Australian and European maxi CD and UK cassette single
 "We Need a Resolution" (album version) – 4:02
 "Messed Up" – 3:33
 "Are You Feelin' Me?" – 3:09
 "We Need a Resolution" (music video) – 3:59

European CD single
 "We Need a Resolution" (album version) – 4:02
 "Messed Up" – 3:33

European 12-inch vinyl
 "We Need a Resolution" (album version) – 4:02
 "We Need a Resolution" (instrumental) – 4:02
 "Messed Up" – 3:33

French maxi CD single
 "We Need a Resolution" (album version) – 4:02
 "Messed Up" – 3:33
 "We Need a Resolution" (music video) – 3:59

Credits and personnel
Credits are adapted from the liner notes of Aaliyah.
 Aaliyah – vocals
 Jimmy Douglass – engineering, mixing
 Static Major – writing
 Timbaland – mixing, production, vocals, writing

Charts

Weekly charts

Year-end charts

Release history

References

External links
 Official website
 
 

2001 singles
2001 songs
Aaliyah songs
Music videos directed by Paul Hunter (director)
Song recordings produced by Timbaland
Songs written by Static Major
Songs written by Timbaland
Timbaland songs